Tomáš Frolo (born January 26, 1982) is a Slovak former professional ice hockey defenceman who last played for VHK Vsetín of the Czech 1. Liga. He played with HC Plzeň in the Czech Extraliga during the 2010–11 Czech Extraliga season.

Frolo previously played for HC Vsetín, HC Oceláři Třinec, BK Mladá Boleslav and HC České Budějovice.

Career statistics

References

External links

1982 births
Living people
BK Mladá Boleslav players
HC '05 Banská Bystrica players
Rytíři Kladno players
HC Litvínov players
HC Most players
HC RT Torax Poruba players
HC Oceláři Třinec players
HC Plzeň players
HC Slezan Opava players
HKM Zvolen players
Hokej Šumperk 2003 players
IHC Písek players
LHK Jestřábi Prostějov players
Motor České Budějovice players
Orli Znojmo players
Sportspeople from Považská Bystrica
Saryarka Karagandy players
Slovak ice hockey defencemen
VHK Vsetín players
Slovak expatriate ice hockey players in the Czech Republic
Expatriate ice hockey players in Kazakhstan
Slovak expatriate sportspeople in Kazakhstan